The 1890–91 United States Senate elections were held on various dates in various states. As these U.S. Senate elections were prior to the ratification of the Seventeenth Amendment in 1913, senators were chosen by state legislatures. Senators were elected over a wide range of time throughout 1890 and 1891, and a seat may have been filled months late or remained vacant due to legislative deadlock. In these elections, terms were up for the senators in Class 3.

The Republican Party lost four seats, though still retaining a slim majority.  That majority was increased, however, upon the admission of two more states with Republican senators.

Results summary 
Senate party division, 52nd Congress (1891–1893)

 Majority party: Republican (47)
 Minority party: Democratic (39)
 Other parties: Populist (2)
 Total seats: 88

Change in Senate composition

Before the elections 

After the admission of Montana's new senators in January 1890.

After the class 3 elections

Beginning of the next Congress

Race summaries

Elections during the 51st Congress 
In these elections, the winners were seated during 1890 or in 1891 before March 4; ordered by election date.

Races leading to the 52nd Congress 

In these regular elections, the winners were elected for the term beginning March 4, 1891; ordered by state.

All of the elections involved the Class 3 seats.

Election during the 52nd Congress 
In these elections, the winners were elected in 1891 after March 4; ordered by election date.

Idaho 

In July 1890, Idaho became a state.  In November, Fred Dubois helped engineer a plan for the Idaho Legislature to effectively elect three people to the U.S. Senate: Governor George Shoup to the class 2 seat up for election in 1894, state constitutional convention member William J. McConnell to serve for the remainder of the Fifty-first United States Congress, ending in March 1891, and Dubois himself to succeed McConnell and serve a full six-year term in the class 3 seat beginning in March 1891.

Maryland 

Ephraim King Wilson II was re-elected by an unknown margin of votes, for the Class 3 seat.

New York 

The New York election was held January 20 and 21, 1891, by the New York State Legislature.

Republican William M. Evarts had been elected to this seat in 1885, and his term would expire on March 3, 1891.

At the State election in November 1889, 19 Republicans and 13 Democrats were elected for a two-year term (1890-1891) in the State Senate. At the State election in November 1890, 68 Democrats and 60 Republicans were elected for the session of 1891 to the Assembly. The 114th New York State Legislature met from January 6 to April 30, 1891, at Albany, New York.

The Democratic caucus met on January 19, 74 State legislators attended, and State Senator John C. Jacobs presided. Governor David B. Hill was nominated by acclamation.

The Republican caucus met immediately after the Democratic caucus ended, Assemblyman James W. Husted presided. They re-nominated the incumbent U.S. Senator William M. Evarts unanimously.

On January 20, both Houses of the State legislature took ballots separately. The incumbent U.S. Senator Evarts was the choice of the State Senate, Governor Hill the choice of the Assembly. On January 21, both Houses met in joint session, and comparing nominations, found that they disagreed and proceeded to a joint ballot. Governor Hill was elected by a majority of 2, every member of the Legislature being present.

The seat became vacant on March 4, 1891. David B. Hill remained in office as Governor of New York until December 31, 1891, and took his seat only on January 7, 1892, missing actually only one month of session. There were no special sessions during the 52nd United States Congress and the regular session began only on December 7, 1891. Hill served a single term, and remained in the U.S. Senate until March 3, 1897. In January 1897, Hill was defeated for re-election by Republican Thomas C. Platt who had been a U.S. Senator briefly in 1881.

Pennsylvania 

The Pennsylvania election was held on January 20, 1891. J. Donald Cameron was re-elected by the Pennsylvania General Assembly to the United States Senate.

The Pennsylvania General Assembly, consisting of the House of Representatives and the Senate, convened on January 20, 1891. Incumbent Republican J. Donald Cameron, who was elected in an 1877 special election and re-elected in 1879 and 1885, was a successful candidate for re-election to another term. The results of the vote of both houses combined are as follows:

|-
|-bgcolor="#EEEEEE"
| colspan="3" align="right" | Totals
| align="right" | 254
| align="right" | 100.00%
|}

See also 
 1890 United States elections
 1890 United States House of Representatives elections
 51st United States Congress
 52nd United States Congress

Notes

References

Further reading 
 
 
 
 
 
 Members of the 52nd United States Congress
 , The headline expresses the erroneous belief that Hill, after his election, would resign the governorship and go to Washington, D.C.